Karl Dannemann (22 March 1896 – 4 May 1945) was a German actor. He appeared in more than 50 films between 1934 and 1945.

Partial filmography

 Volldampf voraus! (1934) - Kramer, Obermaat
 Trouble with Jolanthe (1934) - Rupf, der neue Gendarm
 Schwarzer Jäger Johanna (1934) - Volkert Ummen
 Eine Siebzehnjährige (1934) - Christoph, Knecht auf dem Gut
 I for You, You for Me (1934) - Christian Busch
 Sergeant Schwenke (1935) - Oberwachtmeister Wölfert
 Ein Mädel aus guter Familie (1935) - Ein Gendarm
 Joan of Arc (1935) - Englischer Soldat
 An Ideal Husband (1935) - Parker, Oberingenieur
 One Too Many on Board (1935) - III. Offizier Ackermann
 Pillars of Society (1935) - Aune
 The Higher Command (1935) - Wenzel Lukas, Bursche
 Arzt aus Leidenschaft (1936) - Felgentreus Vetter
 Moscow-Shanghai (1936) - Grischa
 Es geht um mein Leben (1936) - Kriminalrat Jastrow
 Der Katzensteg (1937) - Sohn Fritz Merckel
 Tango Notturno (1937) - Smith
 Mit versiegelter Order (1938) - Thomsen
 Abenteuer in Marokko (1938) - Pierre Prévost / Hauptmann Treiber
 Der Spieler (1938)
 Die Pfingstorgel (1938) - Gustav Toelle
 Dreizehn Mann und eine Kanone (1938)
 Water for Canitoga (1939) - Dyke
 Die fremde Frau (1939) - Kapitän Vaisänen
 Alarm at Station III (1939) - Thomas Kolk
 Das Lied der Wüste (1939) - Tom
 The Star of Rio (1940) - Holländischer Beamter der Hafenpolizei
 The Fox of Glenarvon (1940) - Pat Moore
 Achtung! Feind hört mit! (1940) - Portloff
 Für die Katz (1940) - Hinrich Tapken
 Herz geht vor Anker (1940) - Steuermann
 Bismarck (1940) - Adjudant des Prinzen Friedrich Karl (uncredited)
 Blutsbrüderschaft (1941) - Berger
 The Girl from Fano (1941) - Bootsmann
 My Life for Ireland (1941) - Richard Sullivan
 Kopf hoch, Johannes! (1941) - Vater Panse
 Carl Peters (1941) - Dr. Karl Jühlke
 Ich klage an (1941)
 Wedding in Barenhof (1942) - Karl Zitzow, Kutscher und Kammerdiener
 Rembrandt (1942) - Banning Cocq
 Der große Schatten (1942) - Schauspieler
 Die Entlassung (1942)
 Gefährtin meines Sommers (1943) - Förster Heiner Barteck
 Die unheimliche Wandlung des Alex Roscher (1943) - Thomas
 Titanic (1943) - 1. Funker Philipps (uncredited)
 The Golden Spider (1943) - Bumm, Werkmeister
 Ein schöner Tag (1944) - Braschke
 Junge Adler (1944) - Herr Bachus
 The Roedern Affair (1944) - Soldat Knuse
 Das war mein Leben (1944) - Meusers / Bauer
 Eines Tages (1945) - Herr Brösicke
 Die Schenke zur ewigen Liebe (1945) - Pötter
 Der Scheiterhaufen (1945)
 The Court Concert (1948)
 Das fremde Leben (1951) - Herr Kliem

References

External links

1896 births
1945 suicides
German male film actors
20th-century German male actors
Actors from Bremen
Suicides in Germany
German military personnel of World War I